Anna Pavlova (1881–1931) was a Russian ballerina.

Anna Pavlova may also refer to:

 Anna Pavlova (film), a 1983 biographical film on the ballerina
 Anna Pavlova (gymnast) (born 1987), Russian artistic gymnast

Pavlova, Anna